The men's 100 metres T13 event at the 2020 Summer Paralympics in Tokyo, took place on 29 August 2021.

Records
Prior to the competition, the existing records were as follows:

Results

Heats
Heat 1 took place on 29 August 2021, at 12:28:

Heat 2 took place on 29 August 2021, at 12:35:

Heat 3 took place on 29 August 2021, at 12:42:

Final
The final took place on 29 August 2021, at 19:53:

References

Men's 100 metres T13
2021 in men's athletics